Johann Ulrich Schiess (21 February 1813 in Wald, Switzerland – 6 July 1883) was a Swiss politician who served as the third Chancellor of Switzerland.

After having studied at the University of Bâle, he successively studied at Jena, Berlin, and Göttingen, where he obtained a doctorate in 1835. He was a member of the Jenaischen fraternity.

Beginning his working life as an archivist, he became a magistrate from 1836 to 1839 and was elected Chancellor of State of the canton of Appenzell Ausserrhoden (1839-1847). In July 1847, he learned from the newspapers of his appointment as Secretary of State of the Confederacy and took office in November 1847. He also acted as the Federal Chancellor after the resignation of Franz Josef Karl Amrhyn in the Sonderbund crisis.

In the autumn of 1848, the Diet formally elected Schiess as the first Chancellor of the Confederation following the adoption of the Federal Constitution of 1848, a position he held for 33 years. He was awarded an honorary doctorate from the University of Jena in 1862. The Federal Council entrusted him several times with diplomatic missions to neighbouring countries. Following his tenure as Chancellor, he was elected to the National Council as a representative of the canton of Appenzell Ausserrhoden, serving until his death in 1883 from a stroke.

References

1813 births
Federal Chancellors of Switzerland
1883 deaths